Igor Juričić (born 7 November 1974) is a Croatian professional volleyball coach and former player, a former member of the Croatia national team. He is the current head coach of the Polish PlusLiga team, Trefl Gdańsk.

Honours

As a player
 National championships
 1995/1996  Croatian Cup, with Mladost Zagreb
 1995/1996  Croatian Championship, with Mladost Zagreb
 1996/1997  Croatian Cup, with Mladost Zagreb
 1996/1997  Croatian Championship, with Mladost Zagreb
 1997/1998  Croatian Cup, with Mladost Zagreb
 1997/1998  Croatian Championship, with Mladost Zagreb
 1998/1999  Croatian Cup, with Mladost Zagreb
 1998/1999  Croatian Championship, with Mladost Zagreb
 2000/2001  Austrian Cup, with Hotvolleys Vienna
 2000/2001  Austrian Championship, with Hotvolleys Vienna

As a coach
 National championships
 2017/2018  French Cup, with Tourcoing LM
 2020/2021  Greek League Cup, with Foinikas Syros
 2020/2021  Greek Championship, with Foinikas Syros

References

External links

 
 Coach profile at Volleybox.net

1974 births
Living people
Sportspeople from Rijeka 
Croatian men's volleyball players
Croatian volleyball coaches
Volleyball coaches of international teams
Croatian expatriate sportspeople in Poland
Expatriate volleyball players in Poland
Croatian expatriate sportspeople in Austria
Expatriate volleyball players in Austria
Croatian expatriate sportspeople in France
Expatriate volleyball players in France
Croatian expatriate sportspeople in Italy
Expatriate volleyball players in Italy
Croatian expatriate sportspeople in Belgium
Croatian expatriate sportspeople in Russia
Croatian expatriate sportspeople in Greece
AZS Częstochowa players
AS Cannes players
Trefl Gdańsk coaches
Middle blockers